Huon Commonwealth Marine Reserve is a 9,991 km2 marine protected area within Australian waters. The former Tasmanian Seamounts Marine Reserve created in 1999 was incorporated into the Huon reserve in 2007, and is part of the South-east Commonwealth Marine Reserve Network.

They appear as cone-shaped submerged mountains, which provide a range of depths for a diversity of plants and animals. The reserve is a foraging area for great white sharks and seabirds and a spawning or nursery area for important commercial fish, including ocean perch and blue warehou.

Protection
A majority of the Huon marine reserve area is IUCN protected area category VI and zoned as 'Multiple Use'. A smaller section of 'Habitat Protection Zone' in the west of the reserve protects the unique and vulnerable benthic communities of the reserve's seamounts.

See also

Commonwealth marine reserves
Protected areas of Australia
Tasman Sea

Notes

References

External links
Huon Commonwealth Marine Reserve Network website

South-east Commonwealth Marine Reserves Network
Protected areas established in 2007
Protected areas established in 1999
1999 establishments in Australia